Bantyshev, Alexander Olimpievich (1804, Uglich - 1860) was a famous Russian tenor opera singer.

He was an ordinary member of a choir when, with the assistance of the composer Alexey Verstovsky, he was accepted by the Bolshoi Theatre in Moscow as a soloist. He sang there with great success for 25 years. He had bright, beautiful tenor voice for which he was nicknamed the "Moscow Nightingale".  His best role was the role of Torop (or Toropka) in Askold's Grave.  He was also a composer of several romances.

References

1804 births
1860 deaths
People from Uglich
Russian operatic tenors
19th-century male opera singers from the Russian Empire